Jorge Alejandro Soria Quiroga (born 1 November 1936) is a Chilean politician who currently serves as a member of the Senate of his country.

References

External links
 BCN Profile

1936 births
Living people
Chilean people
21st-century Chilean politicians
Socialist Party of Chile politicians
Party for Democracy (Chile) politicians
Communist Party of Chile politicians